Yevgeny Vincente "Bambi" Beja-Emano (born January 30, 1975) is a Filipino politician from the 2nd district of Misamis Oriental in the Philippines. He is currently serving as the Governor of Misamis Oriental. He was first elected as Governor of the province in 2013 and was re-elected in 2016 and 2019. He also served as Congressman of the 2nd District of Misamis Oriental from 2007 to 2013 and Mayor of Tagoloan, Misamis Oriental from 1998 to 2007.

References

External links
Province of Misamis Oriental Official Website

|-

|-

Living people
People from Cagayan de Oro
Hugpong ng Pagbabago politicians
Governors of Misamis Oriental
Members of the House of Representatives of the Philippines from Misamis Oriental
Xavier University – Ateneo de Cagayan alumni
1975 births